The Turkish Super Cup (Turkish: TFF Süper Kupa), as it is currently known, is the annual super cup football match contested between the previous season's Süper Lig champions and the Turkish Cup winners in Turkey. It was originally known as the Cumhurbaşkanlığı Kupası (Presidential Cup) from 1966 to 1998. No competition was held between 1999 and 2005, although there was a substitute competition played under the name of Atatürk Cup in 2000. The rebranded TFF Süper Kupa is a curtain raiser for the upcoming footballing season, usually taking place in August. In case of a team achieving the double, the Turkish Cup runners-up become finalists.

The current holders are 2021–22 Süper Lig winners Trabzonspor, who won against 2021–22 Turkish Cup winners Sivasspor in the 2022 edition. Galatasaray is the most successful team of the competition, with 16 titles in 25 appearances.

History
Between 1966 and 1980 the cup was called Cumhurbaşkanlığı Kupası (Presidential Cup). Following the Turkish coup d'état in 1980, it was renamed to Devlet Başkanlığı Kupası (Head of State Cup) for the 1981 and 1982 finals. After the resumption of democracy, the tournament was renamed back to Cumhurbaşkanlığı Kupası, taking place from 1983 to 1998. Between 1999 and 2005 no competition was held. In the year 2000 there was a substitute competition called Atatürk Cup. In a bid to rebrand and revive the tournament as a super cup, an inaugural 2006 final took place in Germany, where a large population of Turkish immigrants reside. The success of the new format led to the continuation of the TFF Süper Kupa as it is known and contested today.

During the Cumhurbaşkanlığı Kupası era, all matches were played in the Ankara 19 Mayıs Stadium, in the city of Ankara. The only exception to this tradition was the 1975 final, played in the Cebeci İnönü Stadium. After the 2006 rebranding, the cup continued to be contested in a neutral venue, which is picked annually by the Turkish Football Federation.

The finalists always consisted of Süper Lig champions and Turkish Cup winners, but there were exceptions to this rule. In 1968, Fenerbahçe won both the league and the cup, thus achieving the double. The TFF decided to award the Cumhurbaşkalığı Kupası directly to the club, but went on to change the regulations after this case. Between 1973 and 1977, in case of a team achieving the double, the Başbakanlık Kupası (Prime Minister's Cup) winners became the second finalists. During the Turkish coup d'état in 1980, elect government was abolished and between 1981 and 1984 no competition in the name of Chancellery was held. Thus, the Turkish Football Federation made another regulatory change, and awarded the second finalists spot to the Süper Lig runners-up, in case of a team achieving the double. 1983, 1984, 1990 and 1993 finals took place in that fashion.

After the 2006 rebranding, the Turkish Federation revised the regulations for a final time, and the Turkish Cup runners-up began to earn a spot in the competition, in case of a team achieving the double, thus making the game a rematch of that year's Turkish Cup final.

Winners

Key

Presidential Cup

TFF Süper Kupa

Performances

Most common matchups

Records

Most wins: 16
 Galatasaray (1966, 1969, 1972, 1982, 1987, 1988, 1991, 1993, 1996, 1997, 2008, 2012, 2013, 2015, 2016, 2019)
Most appearances: 25
 Galatasaray (1966, 1969, 1971, 1972, 1973, 1976, 1982, 1985, 1987, 1988, 1991, 1993, 1994, 1996, 1997, 1998, 2006, 2008, 2012, 2013, 2014, 2015, 2016, 2018, 2019)
Most consecutive wins: 5
 Trabzonspor (1976, 1977, 1978, 1979, 1980)
Most consecutive appearances: 7
 Beşiktaş (1989, 1990, 1991, 1992, 1993, 1994, 1995)
Biggest win:
 Trabzonspor 4–0 Sivasspor (2022)

Managers
Most Turkish Super Cup wins: 5
 Ahmet Suat Özyazıcı: 1976, 1977, 1978, 1980, 1983 (all with Trabzonspor)
 Fatih Terim: 1996, 1997, 2012, 2013, 2019 (all with Galatasaray)

Players
Most Turkish Super Cup wins: 6
 Şenol Güneş: 1976, 1977, 1978, 1979, 1980, 1983 (all with Trabzonspor)
 Turgay Semercioğlu: 1976, 1977, 1978, 1979, 1980, 1983 (all with Trabzonspor) 
 Necati Özçağlayan: 1976, 1977, 1978, 1979, 1980, 1983 (all with Trabzonspor) 
 Selçuk İnan: 2010 (Trabzonspor), 2012, 2013, 2015, 2016, 2019 (Galatasaray)

See also
 Süper Lig
 Turkish Cup
 Atatürk Cup
 Prime Minister's Cup

References

External links

 TFF Super Cup 
 Turkey - List of Super Cup (President's Cup) Finals, rsssf.com

 
Turkey
Recurring sporting events established in 1966
1966 establishments in Turkey
2